Statherotmantis is a genus of moths belonging to the family Tortricidae.

Species
Statherotmantis laetana Kuznetzov, 1988
Statherotmantis peregrina (Falkovitsh, 1966)
Statherotmantis pictana (Kuznetzov, 1969)
Statherotmantis shicotana (Kuznetzov, 1969)

See also
List of Tortricidae genera

References

External links
tortricidae.com

Tortricidae genera
Olethreutinae
Taxa named by Alexey Diakonoff